Richard Patrick Freeman (April 24, 1869 – July 8, 1944) was a U.S. Representative from Connecticut.

Biography 
Born in New London, Connecticut, Freeman attended the public schools.
He was graduated from Bulkeley High School at New London in 1887, from Noble and Greenough's Preparatory School, Boston, Massachusetts, in 1888, from Harvard University in 1891, and from the law department of Yale University in 1894.
He was admitted to the bar in 1894 and commenced practice in New London, Connecticut.

He served as special agent for the Department of the Interior in the States of Oregon and Washington in 1896–1898.
During the war with Spain served as regimental sergeant major in the Third Regiment, Connecticut Volunteer Infantry, and afterward became major and judge advocate of the Connecticut National Guard.
He served as prosecuting attorney of the city of New London 1898–1901.
He was an unsuccessful candidate for the Republican nomination to Congress in 1912.

Freeman was elected as a Republican to the Sixty-fourth and to the eight succeeding Congresses (March 4, 1915 – March 3, 1933).
He was an unsuccessful candidate for renomination in 1932.
He resumed the practice of law in New London, Connecticut.
He died in Newington, Connecticut, July 8, 1944.
He was interred in Cedar Grove Cemetery, New London, Connecticut.

References

1869 births
1944 deaths
Harvard University alumni
Yale Law School alumni
National Guard (United States) officers
Republican Party members of the United States House of Representatives from Connecticut
Noble and Greenough School alumni